Possum is a 2018 British psychological horror film written and directed by Matthew Holness in his feature film debut, starring Sean Harris and Alun Armstrong. It centres on a disgraced children's puppeteer who returns to his childhood home and is forced to confront trauma he suffered there.

Possum is an adaption of Holness' short story of the same name, published in the horror anthology The New Uncanny: Tales of Unease, and partially inspired by the theories on the uncanny by Sigmund Freud. Holness soon forgot about the idea of adapting the story until he had begun working on developing a possible horror film. As a fan of the horror genre, Holness stated he much preferred horror films that resonate with the audience and force them to reflect on the experience afterward. Possums visual style was inspired by public information films Holness saw in his youth. Other inspirations include Dead of Night (1945), George Romero's Martin (1978), and German Expressionist films. Filming began in Norfolk, with additional filming taking place in Great Yarmouth and Suffolk. The film's score was composed by sound effects and experimental electronic music studio The Radiophonic Workshop, which marked their first soundtrack purposely constructed for a feature film.

Possum premiered at the Edinburgh International Film Festival on June 25, 2018, and later screened in the United States at the Brooklyn Horror Film Festival on October 12, 2018. It was later given a limited theatrical release in the United States, opening in five theatres on November 2, 2018; finishing its limited theatrical run with a gross of $33,271. Later, it was given a home media release. In addition to garnering multiple awards and nominations, it was generally praised by critics for Harris' performance, the film's atmosphere, score, and unsettling imagery, though the story prompted some negative reviews.

Plot
Philip Connell, a disgraced children's puppeteer, is forced to return to his childhood home in Norfolk, which is shared by his decrepit uncle, Maurice. The home is in disrepair due to a past fire. Philip is haunted by a horrific spider-like marionette in his possession, called "Possum", which he keeps in a leather duffel bag. Throughout his time in Norfolk, he repeatedly attempts to dispose of the puppet, but it inexplicably returns to him each time. He recovers a picture book about Possum that he wrote and illustrated as a young boy depicting Possum's origins and how it creeps upon unsuspecting, orphaned children, intent on devouring them in their beds. 

Phillip frequently approaches a closed room in the house. Each time, Maurice asks if he plans to go in, to which he always replies no. Maurice frequently mocks Phillip during their interactions, such as mentioning the disgraceful circumstances that cost him his job and sadistically requesting that Phillip recount traumatic experiences of childhood bullying. He laments Phillip's attempts to dispose of Possum, reminding him that puppetry is something that runs in their family.

News reports begin to surface of a missing local boy, Michael, whom Phillip initially encountered on the train ride to Norfolk. Authorities indicate that a man fitting Phillip's description is a person of interest in the disappearance. He revisits his childhood school, though he is discouraged from lingering by the school's staff and treated with suspicion by the local residents. He is also plagued by strange visions and dreams of Possum creeping up on him in bed. Phillip continues trying unsuccessfully to dispose of Possum—abandoning it in the woods, throwing it off a bridge, breaking it and sinking it off a dock, and even burning it—to no avail. The search for Michael in the papers also causes him to remark that there was a similar case back then of a boy being assaulted by a masked man. When Phillip breaks down in tears, Maurice comforts him. As the search for Michael continues to mount, Maurice informs Phillip that he will be spending some time away and warns Phillip to not bring attention to himself, or trouble back to the house.

In a period of distress, Phillip enters the school and requests that he be allowed to speak to his old form teacher, Mr. Grant. He tells the secretary that Mr. Grant "knew all about what had happened" and promised to go to the police with him. The confused secretary has him wait outside, but Phillip overhears her speaking with the principal about calling the police and he flees. As he runs, he finds himself chased by Possum, until he is seemingly overwhelmed by it, and passes out. Awakening, he returns home to find Maurice gone, but now has horrifying visions of becoming Possum himself.

Philip enters the closed room, which is revealed to be badly charred from a house fire. As he examines curious items within, he is suddenly attacked by a masked man in the shadows. The man removes his mask and reveals he is Maurice. He lewdly taunts Phillip about the deaths of his parents in the fire, leaving him orphaned and in his care, whereupon he beat and sexually abused him throughout his childhood. He muses about how Phillip always knew Maurice was the masked man who assaulted him back then, but that he still never told anyone. As Maurice overpowers a sobbing and mentally-regressed Phillip by beating and molesting him, Phillip hears a whimper from a locked chest in the corner. He overpowers Maurice and breaks his neck. Phillip unlocks the chest, and a terrified Michael scrambles away from inside it. Sitting outside his house, Phillip stares blankly ahead, with Possum's dismembered head in his lap.

Cast
 Sean Harris as Philip, a disgraced and mentally unstable children's puppeteer haunted by the traumatic abuse he suffered as a child at the hands of his uncle
 Alun Armstrong as Maurice, Phillip's abusive uncle who raised Phillip after the death of his parents
 Charlie Eales as Michael, a young boy Phillip befriends who soon goes missing
Additionally, Simon Bubb portrays a man named Mr. Evans. Andy Blithe plays Michael's father, while Ryan Enever plays Michael's uncle. Pamela Cook is seen as a mother in a scene set at a park.

Production

Concept and development

Possum marks the feature film debut of English comedian, author, and director Matthew Holness. Holness had previously worked on the cult television series Garth Marenghi's Darkplace, which he both wrote, directed, and starred in as the title character, as well as the publication of several short stories. Although normally associated with comedies, Holness himself admitted he had always been a fan of the horror genre and works with serious themes, but stressed that it had been difficult to break from his reputation for comedies due to the large following.

The film itself is an adaption of Holness' own short story of the same name, which was published in the horror anthology The New Uncanny: Tales of Unease. The story centered on a character unable to verbally and emotionally express himself due to childhood trauma, choosing instead to do so by creating a horrific puppet. The basis for the story was partially drawn from theories on the uncanny by Sigmund Freud. According to Holness, the publishers had all the writers read Freud's theory of the uncanny. The publishers then told the writers to choose a fear that intrigued them, and write a story in modern language. Holness ended up choosing two, a fear of doppelgängers and a fear of ventriloquists' dummies, combining the two fears so as to avoid being clichéd. After the story's publication, Holness soon forgot about the idea until he had begun working on developing a possible horror film. Developing the film's story, Holness drew upon his love of 1920s and '30s silent films, which he found to be "so brilliantly creepy", with primary use of psychologically-affecting body horror visual narratives. He wanted to replicate this same filmmaking technique, lamenting that many modern films overlooked them and ended up being less creepy. Opting to make "a modern silent film", Holness was then reminded of the original short story, which he felt would fit perfectly with his idea to express as little dialogue as possible.

The film's visual style was inspired by public information films that Holness had seen during his youth. These films, which were intended to shock youth out of making bad decisions, often depicted children being kidnapped, maimed, and/or killed. The films deeply disturbed Holness, who later recalled, "They were put on between children's programming during the day; you'd see these horrific, terrifying films – you got the impression that the adult world was a very tribal place. Of course, now we know several of those films are fronted by real-life monsters." Further inspiration for the film came from silent films such as F.W. Murnau's Nosferatu (1922). Holness also listed films such as George Romero's Martin (1978), and Dead of Night (1945) as inspirations for the film. When the film was originally announced, Holness stated in an interview with Screen Daily, "The film draws on the dark nightmares of silent German expressionist horror, British classics such as The Innocents (1961) and Don't Look Now (1973), as well as the claustrophobic suburban gothic of Pete Walker's Frightmare (1974).

Pre-production

In June 2016 Holness announced the film's development. 
On 3 November 2016 it was officially announced that Holness was writing and directing the film.  In an interview with PopMatters, Holness stated that writing the film's script involved extending the narrative from his original short story: "Short stories are different because they can be very short, they can be just about one scene, one place, one sole thing happening. Certainly with Possum I knew I needed to extend the narrative a bit, to widen it in order for it to be a film in which nothing much on the face of it happens. It needed a bigger sense of climax and confrontation than the original story had, even though the essentials of the short story are in the film." As a fan of the horror genre, Holness stated that he much preferred horror films that "linger with you", forcing the audience to reflect upon the experience afterwards. It was originally decided that intertitles would be used to voice the main character's thoughts throughout the film, with Holness drawing inspiration from the narration of silent films. The idea was later abandoned during the editing process, as Holness felt it slowed down the pacing of the film, instead opting for voice-over narration as he felt the audience could better understand the meaning behind such narration.

Developing the characters in the film, Holness stated that he wanted to "get into the heads of the characters", describing the film as "a very bleak and understated character piece." Holness stressed the importance of making the film 'through Philip's perspective of the world', ensuring that the character remained morally ambiguous. The role of Phillip was originally written with the intention of having John Amplas, who had starred in George Romero's Martin, in the lead role. The role instead went to Sean Harris, who had responded strongly to the idea of starring in the film after reading the script. Initially, Holness had been concerned whether the actor would be able to go to such an emotionally dark place: "the great thing about Sean is that he immerses himself in his characters and is able to go to those places and come back with something that's very affecting and truthful." Holness worked very closely with Harris on developing the character of Phillip, as Holness later recalled "We did a lot of prep work together, discussing Phillip and where he'd come from and what he'd been through, and Sean wasn't really interested in the horror side of it so much as he was getting to the truth of this character and expressing what he'd gone through for the audience." Alun Armstrong was also cast as Phillip's uncle Maurice, after originally turning it down due to scheduling conflicts for another project he was shooting in the United States.

Creature design

The film's Possum puppet was designed by Sydney-based Odd Studios.  The studio had previously contributed to productions of Star Wars: Episode IIAttack of the Clones (2002), Alien: Covenant (2017), Mad Max: Fury Road (2015), and Pirates of the Caribbean: Dead Men Tell No Tales (2017). The idea behind the creation of the puppet came from his own fear of spiders, while clarifying that in the original short story, the Possum was made by Phillip, who constructed it out of pieces of roadkill, and dead animals, with Holness comparing the design to that of the Frankenstein's Monster. While developing the character for the film, Holness felt that the puppet's original design was "too much", prompting the decision to conceal the creature's design for as long as possible. Part of the decision to cut back on the character's screen time came from Holness' feelings that the audience would become desensitized to the puppet's horrific appearance and thus not be as effective. As Holness later noted in an interview, "You can see something horrific, but once you've seen it, the effect wears off, which is why we kept so much of it as secret as possible."

Holness worked closely with designer and close friend Dominic Hailstone on coming up with the puppet's final design. Macabre artworks and taxidermy were heavily referenced during the design process. As creature design supervisor Adam Johansen later stated in an interview, "We tried to achieve a very home made feel for Possum but one that is twisted and disturbing." Using the film's script, Hailstone constructed storyboards showing possible designs for the character, which he then presented to the writer-director. The character's initial design proved to be not as effective as originally thought, with Holness feeling that the puppet's face was "too expressive." With only a week before filming was scheduled to commence, Holness and Hailstone came up with the idea of having the character's face be inexpressive in which the audience could project their own fears onto it. Hailstone then sculpted the Possum's face, which was made to resemble Harris' character, in three to four hours, with Holness approving the final design. The film's reasonably low budget and tight production schedule limited the amount of time that the studio could spend on designing and constructing the character. The head, neck, and body of the Possum was constructed as a simple hand and rod puppet, with the body constructed out of foam latex and the head made out of fiberglass. The puppet's eight spidery legs were designed by Damian Martin, who constructed a jointed armature using multiple pick points of semi-rigid urethane, so that the puppeteering rods could be attached in multiple angles, and sides to allow more range and freedom while operating it. The puppet's complexity, including its eight fragile limbs, required multiple puppeteers to operate it during filming and presented numerous challenges.

Filming

Principal photography began on November 28, 2016, with shooting locations occurring mostly in Norfolk.  Additional filming took place in Great Yarmouth, and Suffolk, with Holness referring to the locations as "stunning and completely unique." The film was shot on a Kodak 35mm film, with Kit Fraser as the film's cinematographer, and production design by Charlotte Pearson.

The setting of the original short story was based on a stretch of the coast in Kent near Whitstable. However, the setting was later changed to Norfolk, due to its similarities and atmosphere, the latter of which Holness stated contributed to the overall mood and feel of the film. He would later discover that the Stiffkey marshes, one of the locations where the crew had filmed, was where the fabled Black Shuck was purported to haunt. Holness later describe the shooting experience as dark and very intense, stating, "there were many scenes in this film that were incredibly difficult and intense to shoot, particularly the final scene. They were dark and depressing to shoot, but that's where the truth of those scenes comes out."

Harris, a method actor of Stanislavski's system, would remain in character throughout the entirety of shooting to the point where the director felt that he was working with Phillip rather than Harris. Having only worked in television, Holness stated that the biggest difference in directing a feature film, for him, was the opportunity to work with "proper actors", who had a different discipline as opposed to television. The director also learned early in principal photography that he didn't need to shoot that many takes for scenes with Harris, as the actor "usually nailed it straight away." Both Harris and Armstrong only interacted with each other while filming their scenes together, as they wanted to create a genuine feeling of separation and tension.

Music 

The film score for Possum was composed by sound effects and experimental electronic music studio The Radiophonic Workshop, marking the studio's first soundtrack purposely constructed for a feature film. The studio itself was created by BBC in the late 1950s, composing many of the sound effects and music for the channel, including the now iconic theme for the television series Doctor Who, before closing in 1998. Initially, the film's editor Tommy Boulding had used an old music soundtrack from BBC Radiophonic Workshop as a temporary placement for the film's soundtrack, in order to properly assess the flow of the film.

Holness responded positively to soundtrack, feeling that it effectively captured the main character's mental state. Holness and Boulding later met with members of the newly revived Radiophonic Workshop, in order to get permission to use the soundtrack for the film. The studio responded enthusiastically to the project after being shown the initial edit for the film, offering to compose the film's soundtrack, much to the director's surprise. Holness later offered praise to the studio's scoring of the film, "What's so brilliant about them is that it's not just music, it's sound design, it's the whole package. Now suddenly, the whole film became Phillip's." Radiophonic's score of the film also featured unreleased material by the studio's original member Delia Derbyshire.

The Possum soundtrack was released on CD and digital download on November 30, 2018. The soundtrack's album cover was designed by Julian House of Ghost Box Records, featuring Harris' character wandering in a barren landscape under an eerie green-tinted filter. The cover design, a recurring theme of the company's creative output, was inspired by school textbooks as well as vintage cover designs of Penguin and Pelican Publishing. The image choice and color tone were intentionally made to instill a combined sense of cosmic horror and psychedelia. Promotional singles for the film were released on October 26, 2018. It was announced that the soundtrack would also be released on vinyl sometime in 2019, however this release never occurred. A special edition vinyl of the film soundtrack was eventually released on June 12, 2021, as a part of that year's Record Store Day.

Track listing

Release
Possum made its premiere at the Edinburgh International Film Festival on June 25, 2018. It was later screened at the Galway Film Fleadh on July 11, and on 27 August at the London FrightFest Film Festival. The film was later released theatrically in the United Kingdom on October 26, 2018. That same day, the film was screened at the Dead of Night Film Festival in Liverpool. On November 15, it was screened at the Mayhem Film Festival in the Broadway Cinema. The screening was followed by a question and answer session with Holness, which was hosted by Steven Sheil.

The film premiered in the United States at the Brooklyn Horror Film Festival on October 12, 2018. It received a limited theatrical release, opening in five theaters in the United States on November 2, 2018. Later, Possum was released via video on demand in the United States on November 2, 2018, coinciding with the film's limited theatrical release that same day. The film was released in the United States on DVD by Dark Sky Films on February 12, 2019. It was later released in the United Kingdom on DVD, Blu-ray and Digital HD by Bulldog Films on March 4, 2019.

Reception

Box office
Possum was given a limited theatrical release in the United Kingdom on October 26, 2018, opening in seven theaters. It grossed a total of $11,596 during its opening weekend. During its second weekend, the film grossed a total of $4,075. The film would eventually attain a total gross of $33,225 by the end of its theatrical run.

Critical response
Its consensus reads, "Unsettling and absorbing in equal measure, Possum presents a dark character study rich with rewards for fans of chilling genre fare." On Metacritic, the film has a weighted average score of 64 out of 100, based on 5 critics, indicating "generally positive reviews".

Kim Newman of Empire Magazine praised Harris' performance, writing, "A disturbing, curiously beautiful British horror exercise. Recommended, but with a warning: next time you wake up in the middle of the night, you'll find Possum at the end of the bed." Peter Bradshaw from TheGuardian.com called it "deadly serious, but carries with it an echo or ghost of how this same material could have been played as ironic black comedy." Neil Young of The Hollywood Reporter called it "a serious and dark journey into the labyrinths of cruelty and abuse", commending the film's acting and production design. Den of Geeks Daniel Kurland hailed the film as "the very best kind of psychological thriller that just continues to drill deeper into the same rich territory", praising Harris' performance, visuals, and its examination of trauma and abuse. Joseph Marczynski of Vice called it "deeply disturbing" and wrote, "Rich in symbolism but sparse in dialogue, Possum is a haunting and otherworldly exploration of Phillip's psyche as he struggles to shed the trauma of childhood abuse." Mark Butler from iNews praised the film's surreal atmosphere, unsettling imagery, soundtrack, and Harris' performance; calling it "a distinctly non-humorous, deeply unsettling psychological horror that leaves a thoroughly haunting impression." Dennis Harvey of Variety praised Harris' and Armstrong's performances, atmosphere, soundtrack, and "striking aesthetic". In his review, Harvey wrote, "Fans of conventional horror will no doubt sigh with boredom over the lack of action, but more adventurous viewers may lend this modest but distinctive enterprise its own eventual cult following." Ben Robins of  Olly Richards from Time Out London praised Harris' performance, and wrote "Icky and unsettling, this British horror film crawls under your skin." Highlighting the film's acting, unsettling imagery, and sound design, Bloody Disgustings Meredith Borders felt that the film's unconventional approach to its story made the film all the more unsettling.

The film was not without its detractors. Pat Brown from Slant Magazine gave the film a negative review, criticizing the film's sparsely written script and finale, while commending the film's atmosphere and haunting imagery. Concluding his review, Brown wrote, "Possum builds toward a revelation, but for such a visually oriented, sparsely written film, that revelation is surprisingly reliant on dialogue. As a result, there's little payoff for all the repetitive series of evocative visions and mute stares." Rich Cline from Shadows on the Wall praised the performances but criticized the characters and situations as having "very little definition", concluding that the film was "definitely creepy, and often very yucky, but it's far too pretentious to be scary." Dave Aldridge of the Radio Times said the film was "too downright weird", but commended Harris' and Armstrong's performances.

Accolades

See also
 Magic (1978), a film with a similar premise of a delusional man whose puppet comes to life

References

External links
 
 

2018 films
2018 horror films
2010s psychological horror films
2010s psychological thriller films
2010s monster movies
British horror films
British psychological horror films
British psychological thriller films
British thriller films
Fictional puppets
Films about child abuse
Films about missing people
Films about pedophilia
Films shot in Norfolk
Films shot in Suffolk
Puppet films
Films based on short fiction
Films about mental health
2010s English-language films
2010s British films
Two-handers